Jack Owen Ingram (born November 15, 1970) is an American country music artist formerly signed to Big Machine Records, an independent record label. He has released eleven studio albums, one extended play, six live albums, and 19 singles. Although active since 1992, Ingram did not reach the U.S. Country Top 40 until the release of his single "Wherever You Are" late-2005. A number one hit on the Billboard country charts, that song was also his first release for Big Machine and that label's first Number One hit. Ingram has sent six other songs into the country Top 40 with "Love You", "Lips of an Angel" (a cover version of a song by Hinder), "Measure of a Man", "Maybe She'll Get Lonely", "That's a Man", and "Barefoot and Crazy".

Biography
Ingram was born in Houston, Texas. He started writing songs and performing while studying psychology at Southern Methodist University in Dallas, where he was member of Alpha Tau Omega.

Musical career
Jack Ingram began his music career singing at a privately owned bar near the TCU campus of Fort Worth, Texas, which was owned by his friend John Clay Wolfe.
Later, during the early 1990s, Jack toured the state of Texas opening for Mark Chesnutt and other acts. His first release was his self-titled album in 1995 via the Rhythmic label, followed by 1995's Lonesome Questions. Warner Bros. Records eventually signed him and released a live album entitled Live at Adair's, and re-issued his first two indie albums.

In 1997 he had his first time on the 22nd season of Austin City Limits. That same year, he released Livin' or Dyin' via Rising Tide Records, which produced his first chart single in the No. 51-peaking "Flutter". Two years later came Hey You via Lucky Dog, a division of Epic Records, which accounted for a No. 64 country single in "How Many Days". In 2000, he collaborated with Charlie Robison and Bruce Robison for the live album Unleashed Live.

Electric, his second album for Lucky Dog, was also his first album to enter Top Country Albums, despite not producing a chart single. This album was supplemented a year later by an EP entitled Electric: Extra Volts before he left Lucky Dog. Two more live albums followed before he signed to Columbia Records for the release of Young Man in 2004, which accounted for no singles. Another live album, Acoustic Motel, was issued in 2005.

On Sunday, February 3, 2013, H-E-B premiered their 'Texas Myths' Super Bowl commercial featuring Jack Ingram.

2005–2011: Big Machine Records
In 2005, Ingram signed to the independent record label Big Machine Records. Under the Big Machine banner, Ingram released a predominantly live album entitled Live: Wherever You Are. His first single release on that record label, "Wherever You Are", became Ingram's first top 40, and later his first Number One single on the U.S. Billboard Hot Country Songs charts, as well as the first Number One for the Big Machine label. "Love You", the only other studio track on Live: Wherever You Are, was also released as a single, peaking at No. 12 on the charts. This song was also recorded by Trent Summar & the New Row Mob (whose frontman, Trent Summar, co-wrote it) on their 2005 album Horseshoes & Hand Grenades.

In late 2006, Ingram released a cover of Hinder's song "Lips of an Angel". Ingram's cover peaked at No. 16 on the country charts "Lips of an Angel" was the lead-off single to This Is It, his second album for Big Machine. This album also produced the No. 18 "Measure of a Man" (a Radney Foster co-write) and the No. 24 "Maybe She'll Get Lonely".

In 2008, Ingram appeared at the Argyle Education Foundation Black Diamond Affair.

He won the Academy of Country Music award for top new male vocalist on May 19, 2008. Ingram also filled in for radio host Bob Kingsley on the countdown show "Bob Kingsley's Country Top 40" for the week of September 20–21, 2008.

According to CMT, Ingram's Big Dreams & High Hopes album has "more guts" and Ellis Paul's "The World Ain't Slowing Down" may be the song that takes Ingram to the "next level". Ingram says "It'll be fun for me to expose people to a fantastic song from an artist who's had a 20-year career of being a very successful folk artist." The song was cut from the album. Its lead-off single "That's a Man" charted in the Top 20, followed by "Barefoot and Crazy," which became his second Top 10 hit. The album's next three singles all failed to enter the Top 40: "Seeing Stars" (a duet with Patty Griffin), "Free" and a re-recording of "Barbie Doll" with guest vocals from Dierks Bentley.

On August 26, 2009, Ingram set a Guinness record for the most radio interviews in one day, when he was interviewed 215 times.

Ingram and Big Machine amicably parted ways in late 2011.

As a sideline, Ingram does voice imaging for a number of country stations, including KRYS-FM Corpus Christi; WSIX-FM Nashville; WMIL-FM Milwaukee; KWJJ-FM Portland, Ore.; and KSCS Dallas.

Fundraising
In 2013, Jack teamed up with actor Matthew McConaughey and University of Texas at Austin football coach Mack Brown to create a fundraiser for their favorite children's charities.  Dubbed Mack, Jack & McConaughey, the affair was held April 11–12 at Austin's ACL Live at the Moody Theater and featured a gala, golf tournament, fashion show and two nights of music. Mack, Jack & McConaughey returned in 2014.

Discography

Studio albums

EPs

Live albums

Singles

Music videos

Awards and nominations

References

External links
 

1970 births
21st-century American singers
American country singer-songwriters
Big Machine Records artists
Columbia Records artists
Country musicians from Texas
Living people
Musicians from Houston
People from The Woodlands, Texas
Rising Tide Records artists
Singer-songwriters from Texas